The 6th Gaumee Film Awards ceremony honored the best Maldivian films released between 2008 and 2010. The ceremony was held on 22 October 2015.

Winners and nominees

Main awards
Nominees were announced on 22 October 2015.

Technical awards

Short film

Most wins
Niuma - 6
Happy Birthday - 5
Yoosuf - 4

See also
 Gaumee Film Awards

References

Gaumee Film Awards
2015 film awards
2015 in the Maldives
October 2015 events in Asia